Helen Paul is a Nigerian comedian, singer and actress. She is also a stand-up comedian, known as Tatafo, characterized by a voice range that makes her sound like a child.

She graduated with a doctorate in Theater Arts from the University of Lagos.

Career
Paul has worked and served as a freelance and full-time presenter at several media houses in Nigeria. These include Lagos Television (LTV 8), Continental Broadcasting Service (CBS), and M-Net
(where she currently co-presents JARA on Africa Magic).

Paul broke out as a naughty comic character on the radio program Wetin Dey on Radio Continental 102.3FM, Lagos. She was known on the programme as "Tatafo", a witty kid who addresses and lampoons societal issues in a satirical manner. She also presented programmes on TVC and Naija FM 102.7.

In July 2012 Paul released her debut album Welcome Party, which contains Afro-Pop songs such as "Boju Boju", "Vernacular", "Gbedu", "God Forbid", an Afro RnB song titled "Children of the World", and "Use Calculator", an enlightenment song about the menace of the HIV-AIDs epidemic. She subsequently released some singles, including "Take It Back". In 2018, she released the audio and visuals of her single titled "Never Knew", an inspiring song about her developmental years and career progress thus far.

Paul opened a bridal and fabric boutique in Lagos in 2012 called Massive Fabrics and Bridals. She has since proceeded to open three other outlets of the boutique in different parts of Lagos.

In 2014, she opened a film and theater academy, the Helen Paul Theater and Film Academy. It consists of a dance studio, a makeup studio, a recording studio, a rehearsal studio, a photo studio, a mainly digital library, an editing studio, and a hostel for students.

Personal life 
Paul is married to Femi Bamisile and has two sons.

In 2019, She obtained her doctorate in Theater Arts from the University of Lagos, which she dedicated to her mother.

Filmography 
2011 – The Return of Jenifa – role of Tunrayo
2012 – A Wish – lead role, a woman who battles cancer
2011 – Damage – cameo role
2012 – The Place: Chronicle of the Book
2014 – Alakada2 – supporting role
2014 – Akii The Blind – supporting role
2012 – Osas (Omoge Benin) – comic act
2012 – Igboya
Mama Put – lead role

Awards and recognition 
2022 Professor and Head of Department Music, Art and Entertainment Heart Bible International University, U.S.A.
2012 African Film Awards (Afro-Hollywood, UK) – Comedienne of the Year
2012 Exquisite Lady of the Year Award (Exquisite Magazine) – Female TV Presenter of the Year
2014 Exquisite Lady of the Year Award (Nominated) – TV Presenter of the Year (Jara, Africa Magic)
2014 Nigerian Broadcasters Merit Awards (NBMA) – Outstanding TV presenter (Female) (Entertainment/Talk Show)
2011 City People Entertainment Magazine Award – Female Comedian of the Year

References 

Living people
Nigerian entertainment industry businesspeople
Nigerian women comedians
Musicians from Lagos
Actresses from Lagos
University of Lagos alumni
Nigerian voice actresses
Nigerian radio actors
Radio actresses
1983 births
Nigerian film actresses
Nigerian women singers
Nigerian stand-up comedians
Nigerian television personalities
Nigerian media personalities
Nigerian women radio presenters
Nigerian radio presenters
Nigerian television presenters
Nigerian businesspeople
Nigerian women in business